Statistics of the Primera División de México for the 1969–70 season.

Overview

Torreón was promoted to Primera División.

The season was contested by 16 teams, and Guadalajara won the championship.

No relegation this season, due to the increase of teams to 18 for the 1970-71 season.

Teams

League standings

Results

References
Mexico - List of final tables (RSSSF)

1969-70
Mex
1969–70 in Mexican football